Sharon Trusty (born August 27, 1945) is an American politician who served in the Arkansas Senate from the 4th district from 2001 to 2009.

Early life 
On August 27, 1945, Trusty was born in Oregonia, Ohio.

Education 
Trusty attended Arkansas Tech University.

Career 
Trusty is a businesswoman.

In 1984, Trusty became the co-chair of Arkansas Republican can Party.
In 2000, Trusty became a senator of Arkansas State Senate, which she served until 2009.

Personal life 
Trusty is married with 3 children.

References

External links 
 

1945 births
Living people
Republican Party Arkansas state senators